Robert Julius "Bob" Habenicht (February 13, 1926 – December 24, 1980) was a Major League Baseball pitcher who played for two seasons. He pitched for the St. Louis Cardinals in three games in 1951 and the St. Louis Browns in one game in 1953.

External links

1926 births
1980 deaths
St. Louis Browns players
St. Louis Cardinals players
Major League Baseball pitchers
Baseball players from Missouri
Saint Louis Billikens baseball players
Lima Red Birds players